Rahmatabad (also Romanized as Raḩmatābād; also known as Qal‘eh Sangī, Qal‘eh Sangī-ye Raḩmatābād, and Sarsarī) is a village in Marzdaran Rural District, Marzdaran District, Sarakhs County, Razavi Khorasan Province, Iran. At the 2006 census, its population was 135, in 32 families.

This village is located 95 km southwest of Sarakhs city and next to Kashaf river. Its altitude is 695 meters above sea level and its climate is temperate and dry and located in the mountains.

Anthropology 
The people of this  village are from the Shahsevan and Qashqai tribes who were forced to move to this area during the reign of Reza Shah due to fear of the Shahsevans taking power.

References 

Populated places in Sarakhs County